Terry Matalas (born December 11, 1975) is an American television writer, director, and executive producer, best known for co-creating and showrunning the 12 Monkeys series, which ran for four seasons on SyFy. He was a showrunner on MacGyver for CBS until it was cancelled in 2021, and was showrunner for the second and third seasons of Star Trek: Picard on Paramount+.

Early life and education
Matalas grew up near Raritan, New Jersey. As a teenager, Matalas' favorite movie was Back to the Future, and Star Trek: The Next Generation was one of his favorite shows. He ended up working on projects related to both titles later in his professional career.

Matalas attended Emerson College in Boston, where he met frequent co-collaborator Travis Fickett.

Career

Career beginnings: 2003-2012
Matalas began his career working as an associate on the TV series Star Trek: Voyager and Star Trek: Enterprise, including writing two stories for the latter. He also wrote for Terra Nova on Fox and Nikita on The CW.

In 2011, Matalas and Fickett wrote the graphic novel Witch for Kickstart Comics. In 2012, Matalas wrote the Star Trek: The Next Generation comic miniseries Hive for IDW Publishing.

12 Monkeys
Matalas says he always wanted to create a serialized time travel show. In 2013, he and Fickett co-wrote a spec pilot script called Splinter. Their script received positive responses and ended up at the offices of Atlas Entertainment, the production company that produced the 1995 film 12 Monkeys. The company told Matalas and Fickett that they had been planning to reboot the film as a show, and they wanted the pair to rewrite Splinter as a pilot for12 Monkeys. Rather than completely rewriting their script, Matalas suggested simply changing the characters' names to those from12 Monkeys. Atlas agreed, and SyFy ordered the series. The show ran for four seasons.

During its run, 12 Monkeys earned both critical acclaim and a dedicated viewer base. The show has been praised for its consistent logic regarding time travel, to which Matalas said that his rule in the writers' room was, "If you have to draw a timeline on a dry erase board then we can't use it." Both the cast and the crew, including Matalas, embraced the show's fandom by interacting via social media to answer questions and give shoutouts to individuals.

Matalas often wrote easter eggs into the series. In the second season, the Emerson Hotel is named after his alma mater, and has a clock that is always set to 10:04 in reference to Back to the Future. Matalas also cast Christopher Lloyd in the third season of 12 Monkeys, which he called a "dream come true."

Recent work
In 2018, Matalas sold an original drama series to CBS entitled Apex. The same year, he was hired as a consultant producer on SyFy's Nightflyers, an adaptation of George R.R. Martin's novella of the same name.

In 2019, Matalas was brought on to the reboot of MacGyver for CBS, as a showrunner on the fourth season.

Matalas' drama series The Last American Vampire was announced for defunct streaming service Quibi. Matalas had originally sold the project to NBC as an adaptation of the novel Abraham Lincoln, Vampire Hunter. There is no update since the shuttering of Quibi.

In 2022, Matalas was promoted to co-showrunner of  Star Trek: Picard for the second and third seasons.

Personal life
While making 12 Monkeys, Matalas became a father. In that time he also lost his own dad, with whom he would watch Back to the Future as a child.

Matalas is an official restorer for the original DeLorean cars from the film, and he and fellow enthusiast Joe Walser spent nearly two years working to restore Universal's original hero car. Since its completion, the car has lived in the Petersen Automotive Museum. Matalas also owns a second replica DeLorean, built from parts of the film's second hero car. It has been displayed at the Academy Awards, in Super Bowl commercials, and on Jay Leno's Garage.

Credits

References

External links 

 

Living people
American writers
Showrunners
American film producers
American male screenwriters
American male television writers
American television producers
1975 births
People from Raritan, New Jersey